Edward "Eddie" Sholl (15 April 1872 – 29 June 1952), also known as Ted Sholl, was an Australian rules footballer who played for the Melbourne Football Club in the Victorian Football League (VFL).

Sholl played six games in the 1897 inaugural VFL season, three of which were finals.

He captained Melbourne in 1899 and in the same year represented Victoria in an interstate fixture against South Australia.

A fullback, he kept Gerald Brosnan goal-less in the 1900 VFL Grand Final, which Melbourne won.

References

External links

1872 births
1952 deaths
Melbourne Football Club players
Melbourne Football Club captains
Australian rules footballers from Melbourne
Melbourne Football Club (VFA) players
North Melbourne Football Club (VFA) players
Melbourne Football Club Premiership players
One-time VFL/AFL Premiership players